Conrado F. Estrella Sr. (August 19, 1917 – May 31, 2011) was a Filipino politician. He served as the Governor of Pangasinan from 1954 to 1963 and Secretary and Minister of the Department of Agrarian Reform from 1971 to 1986. He was the grandfather of Abono Rep. Robert Raymond Estrella and former Pangasinan Rep. Conrado Estrella III.

Estrella began his political career as the Mayor of Rosales, Pangasinan. He was elected as an assemblyman to the Batasang Pambansa from 1978 to 1986. He served as the Secreary and Minister of the Department of Agrarian Reform under former President Ferdinand Marcos from 1971 until Marcos' ouster in 1986. Marcos and Estrella were political allies.

Estrella's last public appearance was on January 10, 2011, in Pangasinan for the 66th anniversary of the Invasion of Lingayen Gulf.

Estrella died in his sleep at his home in Villa Verde, Pasig, at the age of 93. He was found the next morning on May 31, 2011. He had undergone open heart surgery several years prior, but had no other major illnesses.

References

1917 births
2011 deaths
Governors of Pangasinan
Secretaries of Agrarian Reform of the Philippines
Mayors of places in Pangasinan
People from Pangasinan
Members of the House of Representatives of the Philippines from Pangasinan
Corazon Aquino administration cabinet members
Ferdinand Marcos administration cabinet members
Members of the Batasang Pambansa